John Mulholland, 1st Baron Dunleath   (16 December 1819 – 11 December 1895) was an Irish businessman and Conservative Member of Parliament.

Early life
Dunleath was born the son of Elizabeth MacDonnell (a daughter of Thomas MacDonnell of Belfast) and Lord Mayor of Belfast Andrew Mulholland of Ballywalter Park in County Down.

Career
He was involved in the Mulholland family cotton and linen industry and also represented Downpatrick in the British House of Commons from 1874 to 1885.

In 1892, he was raised to the peerage as Baron Dunleath, of Ballywalter in the County of Down.

Sailing 

"Aside from linen and politics, the 1st Lord Dunleath's other great interest was sailing." according to the Introduction to the Dunleith Papers held at the Public Record Office of Northern Ireland.

The 77ft schooner Egeria was built for him in 1865 by Wanhill's Yard of Hamworthy, raced successfully for many years, and was retained and sailed by his son, Henry.

In 1866 he became Vice-Commodore of the Royal Ulster Yacht Club.

Personal life
In 1851, Lord Dunleath was married to Frances Louisa Lyle (d. 1909), daughter of Hugh Lyle and Harriet Cromie (a daughter of John Cromie) of Knocktarna in County Londonderry. Together, they were the parents of:

 Hon. Andrew Walter Mulholland, who married Hon. Amy Harriet Lubbock, daughter of John Lubbock, 1st Baron Avebury, in 1877, three months before his death.
 Henry Lyle Mulholland, 2nd Baron Dunleath, who married Norah Louisa Fanny Ward, a granddaughter of Edward Ward, 3rd Viscount Bangor and Lord George Hill in 1881.
 Hon. Alfred John Mulholland, who married Mabel Charlotte Saunderson.
 Hon. Alice Elizabeth Mulholland, who married John George Beresford Massy-Beresford.
 Hon. Helen Mary Mulholland, who married Sir George Herbert Murray (their great-grandson was Iain Murray, 10th Duke of Atholl).
 Hon. Louisa Frances Mulholland, who married Edward Roger Murray Pratt.

He died in December 1895, aged 75, and was succeeded in the barony by his second son Henry. Lady Dunleath died in 1909.

References

External links

1819 births
1895 deaths
Linen industry in Ireland
Barons in the Peerage of the United Kingdom
People educated at the Belfast Royal Academy
Deputy Lieutenants of Down
High Sheriffs of Down
Mulholland, John
Mulholland, John
Mulholland, John
Mulholland, John
Irish Conservative Party MPs
Peers of the United Kingdom created by Queen Victoria